Étival may refer to several communes in France:
 Étival, Jura, in the Jura department
 Étival-Clairefontaine, in the Vosges department
 Étival-lès-le-Mans, in the Sarthe department